The Runaways were an all-female American rock band who recorded and performed from 1975 to 1979. The band released four studio albums and one live album during its run. Among their best-known songs are "Cherry Bomb", "Hollywood", "Queens of Noise" and a cover version of The Velvet Underground's "Rock & Roll". Never a major success in the United States, the Runaways became a sensation overseas, especially in Japan, thanks to the single "Cherry Bomb".

History

Early years
The Runaways were formed in August 1975 by drummer Sandy West and guitarist Joan Jett after they had separately introduced themselves to producer Kim Fowley, who gave Jett's phone number to West. Fowley then helped West and Jett find other members. Two decades later he said, "I didn't put the Runaways together, I had an idea, they had ideas, we all met, there was combustion and out of five different versions of that group came the five girls who were the ones that people liked."

Starting as a power trio with singer/bassist Micki Steele, the Runaways began playing the party and club circuit around Los Angeles. They soon added lead guitarist Lita Ford and Jett switched to rhythm guitar. Steele soon left the group, replaced by bassist Peggy Foster, who left after just one month. Lead singer Cherie Currie was recruited in a local teen nightclub called the Sugar Shack, followed by Jackie Fox on bass.

Fame 
The Runaways were signed to Mercury Records in 1976 and their debut album, The Runaways, was released shortly afterward. The band toured the U.S. in support of headlining groups such as Cheap Trick, Van Halen, Talking Heads, and Tom Petty and the Heartbreakers. For their stage performance, the documentary Edgeplay: A Film About the Runaways (directed by former Runaway bassist Vicki Blue) revealed each girl patterned herself after their musical idol: Currie on David Bowie, Jett on Suzi Quatro, Ford on a cross between Jeff Beck and Ritchie Blackmore, West on Roger Taylor, and Fox on Gene Simmons.

Their second album, Queens of Noise, was released in 1977 and the band performed a world tour in support of the album. The Runaways quickly became lumped in with the growing punk rock movement. The band (already fixtures on the West Coast punk scene) formed alliances with mostly male punk bands such as the Ramones and the Dead Boys (via New York City's CBGB) as well as the British punk scene by hanging out with the likes of the Damned, Generation X and the Sex Pistols.

In the summer of 1977, booking agent David Libert secured dates in Japan, where they played a string of sold-out shows. They were unprepared for the onslaught of fans that greeted them at the airport. Jett later described the mass hysteria as "like Beatlemania". While in Japan, the Runaways had a TV special, did numerous television appearances, and released the album Live in Japan, which went gold. While in Japan, Fox left the band shortly before the group was scheduled to appear at the 1977 Tokyo Music Festival. Many years later, she told the Telegraph her relationship with the band deteriorated after Fowley raped her in front of a roomful of people. Jett took over bass duties until the group returned home and recruited Vicki Blue. Currie then left the group after a blow-up with Ford in the fall of 1977. Jett, who had previously shared vocals with Currie, took over lead vocals full-time. The band released their fourth album, Waitin' for the Night, and started a world tour in support of the Ramones.

Dissolution 
Due to disagreements over money and the management of the band, the Runaways and Kim Fowley parted ways in 1977. The group quickly hired Toby Mamis, who worked for Blondie and Suzi Quatro. When the group split from Fowley, they also parted with their record label Mercury/PolyGram, to which their deal was tied. In the Edgeplay documentary, members of the group (especially Fox and Currie) as well as the parents of Currie and West, have accused Fowley, and others assigned to look after the band, of broken promises as to schooling and other care, using divide and conquer tactics to keep control of the band, along with the verbal taunting of band members. The band reportedly spent much time enjoying the excesses of the rock 'n' roll lifestyle during this time. They partnered with Thin Lizzy producer John Alcock, after Jett's future partner Kenny Laguna turned down the job, to record their last album And Now... The Runaways.

Blue left the group due to medical problems and was briefly replaced by Laurie McAllister in November 1978. McAllister was referred to the band by her neighbor, Duane Hitchings, who played keyboards on And Now... The Runaways. Before joining the Runaways, McAllister played with "Baby Roulette and the Rave Ons", who had one song released on a Kim Fowley compilation LP called Vampires From Outer Space. McAllister appeared onstage with the Runaways at their final shows in California in December 1978 and quit in January 1979.

Disagreement among band members included the musical style; Jett wanted the band to make a musical change, shifting towards punk rock/glam rock while Ford and West wanted to continue playing hard rock/heavy metal music. Neither would accept the other's point of view. The band played their last concert on New Year's Eve 1978 at the Cow Palace and officially broke up in April 1979.

Potential reunion 
In 2010, Jett and Currie reunited to re-record the song "Cherry Bomb" for the video game Guitar Hero: Warriors of Rock.

In a 2015 interview with WHMH-FM, Ford said that she decided against a possible reunion in the early '90s because "Nirvana was just kicking in, and it was really bad timing; it wouldn't have worked. People would have just turned their nose up at it."

In December 2018, Ford said that a Runaways reunion would never happen and blamed Jett's manager Kenny Laguna as the reason saying "Joan Jett is very much in 'Joan Jett land,' I guess you could say. Will she ever come out of Joan Jett land? I don't think so. I think her manager controls that and it's really up to him and her. It seems to me like Joan Jett's manager just runs her life in every way, shape, or form. He's very controlling and he has a real problem with me. He has a real issue with me. He sees me as a threat, which is ridiculous, because she's like my sister and I love Joan. It's ridiculous, it's uncalled for, and it's caused a little bit of rivalry between her and I, which is totally uncalled for. It's his fault. The hard part is just trying to communicate with Joan without her manager involved. We had dinner a couple of years ago, what was supposed to be a girl's night out, and she brought her manager with her. So it's like, dude, answer the question. I'm trying to ask you a question. Are you interested in putting The Runaways back together? She never answered the question."

Currie in May 2021 was asked about a reunion saying "I've played with all the girls individually, I've played with all of them — with Lita, with Joan, and, of course, with Sandy; I never did a show without her before she passed away. So I'm the only one that's actually played with all the members. Lita and Joan have a little bit of an issue, and that just seems to be the problem. Lita doesn't like Kenny. I wish they would get over it, honestly, but I don't think so. Kenny was my manager during the early stages of making Blvds Of Splendor. We were very good friends for 20 years. But then, unfortunately, with the record, with them holding up Blvds Of Splendor for 10 years, that kind of eroded my friendship with him a bit."

After the breakup

Joan Jett

Jett went on to work with producer Kenny Laguna and after being rejected by 23 record labels, formed their own label, Blackheart Records, in 1980. In doing so, Jett became one of the first female recording artists to found her own record label. The label continues to release albums by the Blackhearts and other bands. Jett went on to have massive success with a cover of the Arrows' song "I Love Rock 'n' Roll", as well as "Crimson and Clover", "Bad Reputation", and "I Hate Myself for Loving You". She also co-starred in the 1987 film Light of Day with Michael J. Fox, and appeared in the 2000 Broadway revival of The Rocky Horror Show as Columbia. Jett is on Rolling Stone magazine's list of "The 100 Greatest Guitarists of All Time". In 2015, she and her band the Blackhearts were inducted into the Rock and Roll Hall of Fame.

Sandy West

West continued her association with John Alcock once the group disbanded. She formed the Sandy West Band and toured California throughout the 1980s and 1990s. She also did session work with John Entwistle of The Who and became a drum teacher. West was diagnosed with lung cancer in 2005 and died from it in October 2006. A memorial tribute concert was later held in Los Angeles, featuring the Sandy West Band, Cherie Currie, The Bangles, The Donnas, and Carmine and Vinny Appice, among several others.

Micki Steele

Steele (as Michael Steele) joined the band The Bangles and went on to success with songs such as "Manic Monday", "Walk Like an Egyptian" and "Eternal Flame".

Cherie Currie

Upon leaving the Runaways, Currie released a 1978 solo album titled Beauty's Only Skin Deep and a 1980 duet album with her twin sister Marie Currie, Messin' with the Boys, in which the duo was backed by members of Toto. The Curries' cover of Russ Ballard's "Since You Been Gone" reached Number 95 on the U.S. chart. Currie also appeared in a number of films, most notably Foxes with Jodie Foster. Throughout the 1990s, Currie worked as a drug counselor for addicted teens and as a personal fitness trainer. She married actor Robert Hays and they had a son together, Jake Hays. The couple divorced in 1997.

Currie still performs and records, remaining under contract with Blackheart Records, but her current passion is chainsaw carving which she displays at an art gallery in Chatsworth, California. In 2013, Cherie recorded two songs with Alexx Michael for the Munich-based hard rock-glam metal group Shameless, which were released on the album Beautiful Disaster on October 2, 2013. Currie's most recent solo album, Blvds of Splendor, was released in 2020.

Lita Ford

Ford returned to PolyGram as a solo artist in the 1980s, where she released several albums before pairing with manager Sharon Osbourne. She had success with songs like "Kiss Me Deadly" and "Close My Eyes Forever" (the second a duet with her manager's husband Ozzy Osbourne). She was married to Chris Holmes of W.A.S.P., and to former Nitro singer Jim Gillette, with whom she has two sons. After a long hiatus, Ford staged a comeback, performing at Rock The Bayou and other hard rock festivals during the summer of 2008. She released Wicked Wonderland, her first studio album in 14 years, on October 6, 2009. During that year Ford toured as a special guest of progressive metal band Queensrÿche and performed songs from Wicked Wonderland and reprised her duet "Close My Eyes Forever" with Queensrÿche lead singer Geoff Tate.

Vicki Blue

Vicki Blue is now known as Victory Tischler-Blue. After leaving the Runaways, she shifted her focus to film and television production eventually becoming a producer/director for several reality- and magazine-based television shows including Entertainment Tonight, Access Hollywood, and Real Stories of the Highway Patrol. She went on to form Sacred Dogs Entertainment Group a motion picture production company and released a documentary on the Runaways called Edgeplay: A Film About the Runaways. In 2005, Tischler-Blue directed Naked Under Leather, a documentary about fellow female rocker Suzi Quatro, which was selected for the Santa Cruz Film Festival in May 2004 but never released. Focusing on music driven productions, she was tapped to executive produce a network special: The Bee Gees "Unbroken Fever"—The 30th Anniversary of Saturday Night Fever. Additionally, Tischler-Blue and Ford teamed up to record music for El Guitarrista, an animated series that Sacred Dogs Entertainment Group is producing.

Jackie Fox

Fox returned to using her birth name of Fuchs and graduated from UCLA summa cum laude, with a Bachelor of Arts in Linguistics and Italian. She later received a Juris Doctor from Harvard Law School and practices entertainment law. She co-wrote "Delilah's Scissors" with Tischler-Blue and executive-produced and appeared in Edgeplay, Tischler-Blue's 2005 documentary about the Runaways. She also writes an L.A. cat care column for Examiner.com and is an occasional contributor to Listverse.com. She is the author of The Well, an unpublished work of young adult historical fiction, and is currently working on her second novel. In December 2018 she won four games on the game show Jeopardy!

In July 2015, after Fowley's death, Fuchs revealed publicly that Fowley raped her on New Year's Eve 1975 at a party after a Runaways performance at a club in Orange County. Sixteen years old at the time, she was reportedly given Quaaludes by a man who she thought was a roadie and raped while she was incapacitated. Currie said she spoke up against Fowley's actions, then stormed out of the room when he refused to stop. Look Away, a documentary about sexual abuse in the rock music industry features Fuchs' story.

Laurie McAllister
McAllister joined another of Fowley's all-female bands, the Orchids, who released their only album in 1980. McAllister retired from the music industry and worked as a veterinarian technician in Eugene, Oregon. She died of complications from an asthma attack on August 25, 2011 at the age of 54.

Members

 
Former Members 
Joan Jett – rhythm guitar (1975–1979), lead guitar (1975), backing vocals (1975–1977, 1978); lead vocals (1975–1979), bass (1977, 1979)
Sandy West – drums, percussion, backing vocals (1975–1979; died 2006); lead vocals (1978) 
Micki Steele – lead vocals, bass (1975)
Lita Ford – lead guitar, backing vocals (1975–1979);  rhythm guitar (1977, 1979)  bass (1978); lead vocals  (1978)
Peggy Foster – bass (1975)
Cherie Currie – lead vocals (1975–1977); tambourine, snare drum (1977)
Jackie Fox – bass, backing vocals (1975–1977)
Vicki Blue – bass, backing vocals (1977–1978)
Laurie McAllister – bass, backing vocals (1978–1979; died 2011)

Session musicians
Rodney Bingenheimer – orchestration on The Runaways (1976)
Duane Hitchings – keyboards on And Now... The Runaways (1978)

Timeline

Discography

Studio albums

Live albums

Compilation albums 

 Flaming Schoolgirls (1980, Cherry Red)
 Little Lost Girls (1981, Rhino)
 The Best of the Runaways (1982, Mercury)
 I Love Playin' with Fire (1982, Cherry Red)
 Born to be Bad (1991, Marilyn)
 Neon Angels (1992, Mercury)
 The Runaways featuring Joan Jett and Lita Ford (1997, PolyGram)
 20th Century Masters - The Millennium Collection: The Best of the Runaways (2005, Universal)
 The Mercury Albums Anthology (2010, Hip-O)

Charted singles

Use in media
 "Cherry Bomb" appears on the soundtracks of Dawn: Portrait of a Teenage Runaway, Dazed and Confused, RV, Cherrybomb, Guardians of the Galaxy and The Boys.
 In Margaret Cho's stand-up DVD special I'm The One That I Want "Cherry Bomb" is played as she is making her entrance.
 The television sitcom Step by Step named one of their episodes after the Runaways' song "School Days" (They changed the spelling to "School Daze")
 "School Days" appears in the 1999 movie Detroit Rock City, and it was played in an episode of the teen drama 90210, the episode "What's Past Is Prologue".
 In the teen drama The O.C., in the Season 3 episode "The Man of the Year", Marissa makes an entrance to "Cherry Bomb", while dressed in a provocative schoolgirl outfit, to Kaitlyn's boarding school. In another episode of The O.C., in the Season 1 episode "The Girlfriend", "Wait for Me" by the Runaways' was played.
 In the 2007 movie Juno, the main character mentions her three favorite bands, one of which is the Runaways.
 In the 2007 novel Derby Girl, by Shauna Cross, Oliver is said to have a poster of Joan Jett "in her Runaways days". The band is also referenced in a chapter title.
 In the 2008 novel Lonely Werewolf Girl, by Martin Millar, the main character's favorite band is the Runaways.
 The Runaways' song "You Drive Me Wild" was played in an episode of the comedy-drama Entourage, in the episode "Unlike a Virgin".
 A cover version of "Cherry Bomb" is available for download in the music video game Rock Band. The song was re-recorded by Cherie Currie and Joan Jett in 2010 for inclusion in Guitar Hero: Warriors of Rock.
 "Cherry Bomb" appears as load-screen background music in the video game Lollipop Chainsaw.
 Queens of Noise: The Real Story of the Runaways by  Evelyn McDonald was released July 9, 2013.
 "Dead End Justice" was used in Stranger Things season 2 episode 7 "The Lost Sister" as Jane (eleven), Kali (eight), and the rest of Kali's crew leave their headquarters.

Influence
The Runaways' success paved the way for many successful female artists and female bands over the past 30 years, including the Bangles, the Go-Go's, Sahara Hotnights, L7, the Donnas, and Vixen to enter the male-dominated arena of rock music. They are named as influences by several artists, including the Germs, Courtney Love, the Adolescents, Taylor Momsen, White Flag, and Rhino Bucket who acknowledged the Runaways' influence on their music during their performance at the December 2006 tribute concert honoring Sandy West.

Film

A biographical film about the band, inspired by Currie's memoir, was released in 2010. Jett was one of the executive producers of the film. Actresses Kristen Stewart and Dakota Fanning starred as Jett and Currie, respectively. Michael Shannon played Fowley. None of the band's former bass players were featured in the film; Fox did not want to be involved in any part of the film, and requested that her name be changed in the story. The fictional replacement is named Robin Robbins. The film was written and directed by Floria Sigismondi, and was released to limited theaters on March 19, 2010.

The Runaways received generally positive reviews from critics. On review aggregator Rotten Tomatoes, the film has a 70% rating based on 187 reviews, and an average rating of 6.19/10.

New Runaways (1987)
In the early 1980s, Gayle Welch, an ambitious 13-year-old girl from Kaitaia, New Zealand, wrote a song, "Day of Age", and recorded it in Mandrell Recording Studios in Auckland, New Zealand. The resulting tape found its way to Fowley's desk. He played the Welch tape for colleague and Los Angeles deejay Rodney Bingenheimer, who played the song on his show on radio KROQ and included it on his annual compilation of his most-liked music for the year. Also on that compilation was a song that featured Chicago-native guitarist Bill Millay.

It did not take long before Fowley, who still owned the Runaways trademark, was putting together a new Runaways band built around Welch. Missy Bonilla was recruited from the typing pool of CBS Records, Denise Pryor came from Compton and Kathrine Dombrowski ("Kathy DiAmber") was also added. Welch was present only on tape and only on the first song on the CD, "I Want to Run With the Bad Boys". Millay played guitar, David Carr played keyboards and a drum machine rounded out the team. Glenn Holland, also from New Zealand, a friend of both Bingenheimer and Fowley, facilitated. The album, Young and Fast, was released in 1987, and was a minor hit.

References

External links

 
 Joan Jett official Site
 Lita Ford official site
 Victory Tischler-Blue official site
 Sacred Dogs Entertainment Group official site
 Jackie Fox's Runaways essays
 
 
 The Runaways on Metaladies.com

 
All-female bands
Hard rock musical groups from California
Mercury Records artists
Musical groups disestablished in 1979
Musical groups established in 1975
Punk rock groups from California
Cherry Red Records artists